In May and June 1945, at the end of World War II in Europe, the forests near Macelj, a village in northern Croatia, was the site where a large number of soldiers, women and children, were shot during the Bleiburg repatriations.

Events
In 1992, after Croatia became independent, 1,163 bodies were excavated from 23 mass graves in the region, leaving around 130 possible mass grave locations unexplored.

Among those executed in Macelj were 25 Catholic priests from the Franciscan monastery of Široki Brijeg which were temporarily hidden in nearby Krapina. In 2008, the Croatian Ministry of the Interior launched an investigation into Stjepan Hršak's possible involvement in that event.

Reburial of excavated bodies in 2005 was followed by public mass led by Cardinal Josip Bozanić, at the time Archbishop of Zagreb.

See also
 Tezno mass graves
 Mass killings under communist regimes

References

1945 in Croatia
Massacres in 1945
Independent State of Croatia
World War II crimes
Aftermath of World War II in Yugoslavia
Massacres in Croatia
Massacres in Yugoslavia
Political and cultural purges
Political repression in Communist Yugoslavia
May 1945 events in Europe
June 1945 events in Europe
Mass murder in 1945
Massacres of Croats